Matryona's Place,  sometimes translated as Matryona's Home (or House), is a novella written in 1959 by Aleksandr Solzhenitsyn. First published by Aleksandr Tvardovsky in the Russian literary journal Novy Mir in 1963, it is Solzhenitsyn's most read short story.

The narrator, a former prisoner of the Gulag and a teacher of mathematics,  has a longing to return to live in the Russian provinces and takes a job at a school on a collective farm. Matryona offers him a place to live in her tiny, run-down home, but he is told not to expect any "fancy cooking."  They share a single room where they eat and sleep; the narrator sleeps on a camp-bed and Matryona near the stove. The narrator finds the farm workers' lives little different from those of the pre-revolutionary landlords and their serfs. Matryona works on the farm for little or no pay. She is forced to give a small annex of her home to a relative who wants to use the wood from it to build a house elsewhere in the village. A group of drunken farmers, with a tractor borrowed without permission, decide to move the wood at night. Matryona, typically, offers to help. During the chaos that follows she is killed by a train. Her character has been described as "the only true Christian (and) the only true Communist" and her death symbolic of Russia's martyrdom.

Set in 1956, six years after the events portrayed in One Day in the Life of Ivan Denisovich, the novella is considered to be one of the author's finest literary achievements. It is accessible to non-native speakers who have learnt Russian to an intermediate level.

References

Sources

 .
 .
 .
 .
 .
 .
 .
 , Includes translations of An Incident at Krechetovka Station and Matryona's House.

External links
 Audiobook, in Russian

Fiction set in 1956
1959 Russian novels
Novels by Aleksandr Solzhenitsyn
Soviet novellas